Old Hill is an area of Rowley Regis in the metropolitan borough of Sandwell in the West Midlands, England, situated around  north of Halesowen and  south of Dudley. Initially a separate village it is now part of the much larger West Midlands conurbation.

History

Kelly's Directory of Staffordshire, 1896 has the name as Oldhill and states that it is an ecclesiastical parish formed on 26 August 1876 from the civil parish of Rowley Regis in the Kingswinford division of Staffordshire.

Old Hill was historically in the urban district and later county borough of Rowley Regis, in the county of Staffordshire. However, local government reorganisation in 1966 saw it become part of the new County Borough of Warley, and transferred into the county of Worcestershire. This arrangement lasted until 1974, when it became part of the borough of Sandwell in the newly created West Midlands county.

Along with neighbouring Cradley Heath, Old Hill was a centre of the chain-making industry from the mid-nineteenth century. Much production was by outworkers who set up chain-shops in buildings at the rear of their homes. The Eliza Tinsley Company's business in Old Hill was in earlier days based on outworkers making nails and chains. In 1876, between 1,800 and 2,000 outworkers were used. However, as the company started to set up its own work-shops and move production in-house, numbers reduced. By 1934 there were 72 chain-works and chain-shops in Old Hill; almost a third of the total for Great Britain. Outworking declined after the Second World War and died out in the 1950s.

The Trinity Centre shopping parade is built on the site of Trinity Hall. A newspaper report shows the hall to have opened by May 1880. An estimated 1,200 concertgoers attended a performance by the Old Hill Choral Society in January 1890. Besides concerts the hall was used for political rallies and lectures. A series of Gilchrist lectures held in autumn 1894 attracted some eminent speakers. Astronomer Sir Robert Ball presented the first, entitled "An Evening with the Telescope". Later speakers included geologist Charles Lapworth on "Our Midland Coalfields" and Wesleyan minister-cum-scientist Dr William Dallinger on "Spiders: Their work and their wisdom".

Old Hill's commercial centre was by-passed with the construction of a new single-carriageway road (Heathfield Way) which opened on 7 December 1990, relieving the centre of some of its heavy congestion. A rerouted section of Highgate Street, completed in 1988, formed the first phase of the by-pass.

General Facilities

Old Hill High Street is home to several takeaways, ladies clothes shop, pet food shop, former butchers, KFC (opened in 2005 on the site of a former public house) and six different churches. Old Hill has undergone redevelopment. 
Old Hill Police station stands on the Halesowen Road (Closed 2018).

The Eliza Tinsley factory was sold off in 2005 due to the firm's financial difficulties, demolished, and replaced by housing on Tinsley Avenue.

The Cook Shop is the longest serving business in Old Hill and in 2010 celebrated its 120th anniversary under the ownership of the same family. It closed in 2014

Old Hill's market hall closed down in 2006. In December 2010 it reopened as a Costcutter store.

The old Plaza bingo hall, formerly a theatre, has been redeveloped and reopened April 2010. The building now called the Plaza was originally The Grand, a cinema, and then became the Plaza, a dance hall where many stars of the day performed including The Beatles, Joe Brown and Lulu. When it first opened only soft drinks and snacks were available at the 'bar'.

The Waterfall Pub on Waterfall Lane  is regularly included in CAMRA's Good Beer Guide.

Sporting Facilities
Old Hill Cricket Club's ground is found next to Haden Hill Park.

Haden Hill Leisure Centre offers a range of sporting facilities including a gym, swimming pools and squash courts.

Old Hill Wanderers F.C. was an association football club active in the 1890s.

Housing
In 1945 prefabs were built in Cherry Orchard and Spring Meadow to house young families. Although meant to be temporary they were much loved family homes for twenty years or more, until replaced by more modern housing.

The Riddins Mound council estate was built near the Halesowen Road railway overbridge in the 1960s. The estate provided 547 homes, 288 of which were in three 16-storey tower blocks, with the remainder spread across seven three-storey blocks of flats, nine maisonette blocks and four bungalows. However, the estate had fallen into decline by the early 1990s, and in August 1996 one of the tower blocks was demolished in a controlled explosion. The remaining properties have been refurbished and community facilities improved.

Notable buildings
Haden Hill House, a Victorian gentleman's residence and Haden Old Hall are set in a municipal park to the south of the town centre. Both are in the ownership of Sandwell Borough Council and are open to the public.

The Church of the Holy Trinity and a former butcher's shop at 191 Halesowen Road are grade II listed. The latter's listing in 2005 concludes:

Schools and education
Ormiston Forge Academy, (formerly Heathfield Foundation Technology College, and previously Heathfield High School) was built during the 1970s on Wright's Lane and is the only secondary school in Old Hill and Cradley Heath.  A new technology block and a sports hall had been added by 1988.

Old Hill has three primary schools:
 Old Hill Primary School and Nursery is next to Holy Trinity Church on Lawrence Lane/Halesowen Road.
 Redall Hill Primary School and Nursery on Mace Street/Trinity Street is housed in the buildings of the former Macefields Secondary School, which date from 1891.
 Temple Meadow Primary School and Nursery is on Wright's Lane and Clifton Street; two buildings have datestones of 1898.

Transport
Old Hill is served by Old Hill railway station on the main line from Birmingham, Snow Hill to Stourbridge.

Buses run to Halesowen, Dudley, Walsall, West Bromwich, Birmingham and Merry Hill Shopping Centre.

A branch of the Dudley Canal passes to the east of the town.

Former

Trams ran from Old Hill to Blackheath along a single line track with passing place loops owned by Rowley Regis Urban District Council. Perry Park Road with its 100-foot incline and hairpin bend was laid specifically for the tramway to avoid the steeper gradient up Waterfall Lane. The service was operated by Dudley, Stourbridge and District Electric Traction Company and commenced on 19 November 1904. The service continued until 30 June 1927.

Notable people
Old Hill is the birthplace of cricketer Eric Hollies and his father Billy Hollies, one of the last of the underarm bowlers in League cricket. Comedian/comic actress Josie Lawrence, star of Whose Line Is It Anyway? and EastEnders, and who has topped the bill in London's West End was also born here.

Places of worship
Holy Trinity Parish Church stands at the junction of Lawrence Lane and Halesowen Road (the main street). The Grade II listed church building was completed circa 1875 and is built of snecked rock-faced red sandstone. The church was founded by a group of worshippers who preferred a more Protestant liturgy and evangelical style of worship than the High Church form practiced at St Luke's, Cradley Heath.

Almost opposite the parish church on Halesowen Road are the Kingdom Hall of Jehova's Witnesses and the Old Hill Masjid, the latter occupying the former Zion's Hill Methodist Church Sunday School building.

Our Lady of Lourdes Roman Catholic Church was founded in the 1920s in a disused button factory, utilised until a new church was built in the late 1970s. The new church was blessed by the Most Reverend Maurice Couve de Murville, Seventh Archbishop of Birmingham, on 13 October 1988 and was consecrated by the Right Reverend David McGough, Auxiliary Bishop of Birmingham, 1 November 2008.

The Methodists meet at a building on the corner of Lawrence Lane and Clyde Street, built after several other congregations amalgamated. St James Wesleyan Reform Union church is on Highgate Street.
 
Spring Meadow Baptist Church (or Chapel) was established in 1841, thus preceding Holy Trinity Parish Church, and greatly extended in 1864. A number of members and congregation from Spring Meadow left in 1902 to form the Ebenezer Strict Baptist Chapel, and opened a new church building on Station Road in 1904.

Former

The Macefield Mission building in Claremont Street has a datestone of 1904. The Mission had vacated the building prior to February 2022.

Notes

References 

Areas of Sandwell